Patti is an old city, near Tarn Taran Sahib city and a municipal council of the Tarn Taran district in the Majha region of Indian state of Punjab, located 47 Kilometres from Amritsar. Patti city is situated close to the Pakistani border. It is connected through a rail network starting from Amritsar station to Khem Karan station, with Khem Karan being its last station of India.

Patti was a residence of Rai Duni Chand, a rich landlord, one of whose daughters, Bibi Rajni was a known devotee of Guru Ram Das Ji. Mughal Governor of Punjab during Mughal period also lived in Patti. Before independence, Patti was a Tehsil of the Lahore district. The city houses a historic Mughal Fort and remains of the city wall as well as a number of other historical and religious places. Nowadays Patti is developing rapidly but economy of the city is still largely dependent on agriculture and allied activities. There are a number of colleges and schools. Patti has become the first border town in Punjab where all eligible beneficiaries are vaccinated with the first dose of the COVID-19 vaccine and has become an example for other areas in Punjab. The vaccination drive ran under leadership of Dr. Gursimran Singh, a young medical officer working at a local government hospital.

Etymology
Patti (Punjabi: ਪੱਟੀ) in Punjabi means street. The original name of this city was Patti Haibatpura, but over a certain period Patti became its name, and gradually displaced the former.

History
Prior to the partition, Patti was a tehsil of Lahore district. After Amritsar revenue district was split in two, it became a part of the newly created Tarn Taran district. Patti has been a power center and by some estimates it has been so for as long as 1000 years. In the medieval days it was known as 9 lakhi Patti. That means it generated high revenue of Rupees 9 Lakhs. The city has stories of a certain haveli, of its rulers Mirzas, which was destroyed for farming activity later on, as they migrated to Lahore (Pakistan) in 1947.

The city is situated on a mound which adds to its altitude. To the south-east of the city is a smaller but higher mound which projects a Shiva Temple Shiva . Patti houses a fortress built in 1755, which housed the local police station up-till the year 2003.

Patti finds rich references in the Sikh history, especially when there were increased atrocities committed by the Mughal Empire on Sikh Jatthedars (raiders) who looted the residents of the city. The fortress was used to prosecute rebels. The tales of which became a part of everyday Sikh prayer.

In the battle of misls, Patti was ultimately won by Faisailpuria(Singhpuria) Misl. Rumours suggest that Maharaja Ranjit Singh sent his army to siege the town when Mirza Talib Ali Baig rebelled against him for Sikh atrocities on Muslims, particularly banning of their call for prayer (Azan). During this siege, part of the outer wall was demolished.

Patti is also referenced as a place of the Pir (Sufism) and there were many houses of Pirs who belonged to Gillani's family. There are also shirines of Gillani's  family. After the partition, the Gillani family settled in Pakistan.Patti is mentioned as 'putee', having a population of 5000, in 19th century historical book "travels into Bokhara" by Alexander Burnes.

Demographics
As of 2011 Indian Census, Patti had a total population of 40,976, of which 21,668 were males and 19,308 were females. The sex ratio is 891. Population within the age group of 0 to 6 years was 4,595. The total number of literates in Patti was 28,290, which constituted 69.0% of the population with male literacy of 72.6% and female literacy of 65.0%. The effective literacy rate of 7+ population of Patti was 77.8%, of which male literacy rate was 82.1% and female literacy rate was 72.9%. The Scheduled Castes population was 10,346. Patti had 7607 households in 2011.

Politics 
The city is part of the Patti Assembly Constituency.

Transportation 
Patti has a railway station and a bus terminal. Patti is located centrally and equidistant from other important towns of the area like Harike, Bhikhiwind, Valtoha, etc.

Schools in Patti City 
D.A.V sen. sec school
Morning Star Sen. Sec School
Sacred Heart Convent School
Cambridge International School
Central Convent School
Super Kidz PlaySchool
Satluj Public School
Shaheed Bhagat Singh sen sec school
Sri Guru Harkrishan sen. sec. school
Futech Computer Education Centre
Wood Blossom School
Shri Mahavir Jain Model High School

Colleges in Patti City 
Guru Nanak Dev University
Shaheed Bhagat Singh Polytechnic & Pharmacy College

Gurudwara in Patti City 

 Baba Bidhi Chand Ji Gurudwara
 Bibi Rajni Ji Gurudwara

References

Cities and towns in Tarn Taran district